Joe Austin-Smellie (born 17 October 1989) is a New Zealand cricketer. He played in sixteen first-class and nine List A matches for Wellington from 2009 to 2011.

See also
 List of Wellington representative cricketers

References

External links
 

1989 births
Living people
New Zealand cricketers
Wellington cricketers
Cricketers from Dunedin